Lulua District was a district of the Belgian Congo and the Democratic Republic of the Congo.
The city of Kananga (formerly known as Luluabourg) was at the center of the district, but had a separate administration.  
In 2015 Lulua District became the province of Kasaï-Central.

Territories

The district was divided into five territories:

History

In 1933 the original four provinces of the Belgian Congo were reorganized into six provinces, named after their capitals, and the central government assumed more control.
Congo-Kasaï province was split, with the eastern part renamed Lusambo Province.
The number of districts in the colony was reduced to 15.
Lusambo Province contained the districts of Sankuru to the east and Kasai to the west.
Lusambo Province was renamed Kasai Province in 1947 and some of the districts were divided up.

A 1955–1957 map shows that Sankuru District had been divided into a smaller Sankuru District to the north and a new Kabinda District to the south, while Kasai District had been divided into a smaller Kasai District to the west and a new Lulua district to the southeast.
Lulua District bordered Sankuru District to the north, Kabinda District to the east, Haut-Lomami District to the south, the Portuguese territories to the southwest and Kasai District to the west.

Luluabourg province was created in 1962 from the former Kasai Province. It was incorporated into Kasai-Occidental in 1966 under the Mobutu regime.
Presidents (from 1965, governors) of Luluabourg province were
 September 1962 -    September 1963  François Luakabwanga (1st time)
 September 1963 - 25 September 1964  André Lubaya   (d. 1968)
 25 September 1964 -    December 1965  François Luakabwanga (2nd time)
 January 1966 - 18 April 1966  Constantin Tshilumba
 18 April 1966 - 25 April 1966  François Luakabwanga (3rd time)

Lulua was one of 25 new provinces specified in the country's Constitution (effective 18 February 2006).
Lulua District would be combined with the city of Kananga to form the new province, and Kananga would be the capital.
This was completed in 2015, forming the new province of Kasaï-Central.

References

Sources

Districts of the Belgian Congo
Districts of Kasaï-Occidental
Kasaï-Central